

First round selections

The following are the first round picks in the 1983 Major League Baseball draft.

* Did not sign

Compensation picks

Other notable players 
Bill Swift, 2nd round, 29th overall by the Minnesota Twins, but did not sign
Chris Sabo†, 2nd round, 30th overall by the Cincinnati Reds
Dave Magadan, 2nd round, 32nd overall by the New York Mets
Joe Oliver, 2nd round, 41st overall by the Cincinnati Reds
Jeff Robinson, 2nd round, 44th overall by the San Francisco Giants
Glenn Braggs, 2nd round, 54th overall by the Milwaukee Brewers
Rick Aguilera†, 3rd round, 57th overall by the New York Mets
Wally Joyner†, 3rd round, 67th overall by the California Angels
Charlie Hayes, 4th round, 96th overall by the San Francisco Giants
Ron Gant†, 4th round, 100th overall by the Atlanta Braves
Lenny Harris, 5th round, 108th overall by the Cincinnati Reds
Todd Stottlemyre, 5th round, 119th overall by the New York Yankees, but did not sign
John Burkett†, 6th round, 148th overall by the San Francisco Giants
Erik Hanson†, 7th round, 172nd overall by the Montreal Expos, but did not sign
Mike Aldrete, 7th round, 174th overall by the San Francisco Giants
Tom Pagnozzi†, 8th round, 208th overall by the St. Louis Cardinals
Jeff Montgomery†, 9th round, 212th overall by the Cincinnati Reds
Terry Steinbach†, 9th round, 215th overall by the Oakland Athletics
Glenallen Hill, 9th round, 219th overall by the Toronto Blue Jays
Jay Buhner†, 9th round, 230th overall by the Atlanta Braves, but did not sign
Jeff Parrett, 9th round, 236th overall by the Milwaukee Brewers
Greg Cadaret, 11th round, 267th overall by the Oakland Athletics
Doug Drabek†, 11th round, 279th overall by the Chicago White Sox
Kevin Seitzer†, 11th round, 283rd overall by the Kansas City Royals
John Smiley†, 12th round, 300th overall by the Pittsburgh Pirates
John Farrell, 16th round, 403rd overall by the Cleveland Indians, but did not sign
Mike Fetters, 22nd round, 560th overall by the Los Angeles Dodgers, but did not sign
Jeff King, 23rd round, 573rd overall by the Chicago Cubs, but did not sign
Matt Williams†, 27th round, 664th overall by the New York Mets, but did not sign
Mark Lemke, 27th round, 677th overall by the Atlanta Braves
Mike Jackson, 29th round, 721st overall by the Philadelphia Phillies, but did not sign
Todd Zeile, 30th round, 739th overall by the Kansas City Royals, but did not sign
Les Lancaster, 39th round, 811th overall by the Texas Rangers, but did not sign
Glenn Davis, 42nd round, 817th overall by the Texas Rangers, but did not sign

† All-Star  
‡ Hall of Famer

Football players drafted
Turner Gill, 18th round, 457th overall by the New York Yankees, but did not sign
D. J. Dozier, 18th round, 459th overall by the Detroit Tigers, but did not sign

References

External links 
Complete draft list from The Baseball Cube database

Major League Baseball draft
Draft
Major League Baseball draft